Mohamed "Mo" Salah El Boukammiri (born 27 May 2004) is a Belgian professional footballer who plays for the Union SG.

Club career 
Mohamed Salah El Boukammiri first played his youth football in Schaerbeek and Waregem, before joining the Royale Union Saint-Gilloise, where he grew through the youth ranks, becoming part of the first team during the 2022–23 pre-season.

He made his professional debut for the Union on the 23 July 2022, coming on as a late substitute during the Division 1A 1–1 draw against Sint-Truidense.

References

External links

2004 births
Living people
Belgian footballers
Belgium youth international footballers
Association football forwards
Royale Union Saint-Gilloise players
Belgian Pro League players